Theology of culture is a branch of theology that studies culture and cultural phenomenas. It lies close to philosophy of culture, but has focus more on existentialism and spiritualism.

Paul Tillich was the first theologian who wrote about the theology of culture. He discussed about making difference between the sacred and the secular. Nowadays, the theology of culture also deals with cultural differences between religions and thus shares many features with the theology of religions.

References

Practical theology
Culture